Yvette Baker (born Yvette Hague, 1968) is Britain's most successful orienteer. At the 1999 World Orienteering Championships in Inverness she won the short distance event.

Orienteering 

Already at the early age of 15, she won the Elite class of the Jan Kjellstrom Trophy in 1983. The same year she was member of the British relay team at the World Orienteering Championships, making her possibly the youngest WOC participant ever.

During the following years' WOC, she always had promising qualification results in the top 10, but could not match them in the finals. It was not until 1993, when she won Britain's first world championship medal coming third over the classic distance. In 1995, she stepped up by claiming both silver medals in the short and classic distances (again not matching her 1st place of the qualification). After another 1st in the qualification of 1997, finally in 1999 she took the crown by becoming World Orienteering Champion in the short distance event. In 2001, after a winning her fourth consecutive qualification (1995/97/99/01), she retired from the WOC with an 11th place in the long distance event. Between 1983 and 2001, she took part in all 11 WOC.

In domestic competition, she won both the British Orienteering Championships and the JK Orienteering Festival multiple times.

The annual Yvette Baker Trophy and Shield inter-club junior orienteering competition in the UK is named after her.

Fell Running 

Baker also represented England at mountain running and was a successful fell runner, winning races including the Edale Skyline, Duddon Valley, the Three Shires, the Langdale Horseshoe and the Carnethy 5.

Personal life 

She was born in the U.S. to British parents. She grew up in England and then lived for several years in Denmark before moving to New Zealand. She attended Edinburgh University and was a member of Edinburgh University Orienteering Club; she was inducted into the Edinburgh University Hall of Fame in 2011.

See also
 British orienteers
 List of orienteers
 List of orienteering events

References

External links 
 Article about Yvettes WOC history

1968 births
Living people
British orienteers
Female orienteers
Foot orienteers
British fell runners
World Orienteering Championships medalists
Alumni of the University of Edinburgh
Alumni of Keele University